Deborah Reed (née Brown) an American author, was born on November 7, 1963 in Detroit, Michigan. She graduated from John Glenn High School in 1981 in Westland, Michigan. In 1997 she graduated summa cum laude with a BA from Oregon State University. In 2012 she graduated with an MFA in creative writing from Pacific University. She is the author of five novels under her own name, and two thrillers under the pen name Audrey Braun. She lives in Manzanita, Oregon, where she owns and manages a local bookstore.

Works 
Fiction
 Carry Yourself Back to Me, 2011
 Things We Set on Fire, 2013
 Komm wieder zurück: Roman (German Edition), 2013
 Was nach dem Feuer bleibt (German Edition), 2014
 Olivay, 2015
 The Days When Birds Come Back, 2018
 Pale Morning Light with Violet Swan, 2020
Fiction as Audrey Braun
 A Small Fortune, 2011
 Fortune's Deadly Descent, 2012
Nonfiction, Essays, Interviews
 The Art of Reading Per Petterson: Finding Appalachia in a Norwegian Novel, Poets & Writers, March/April 2015
 What the Dog Knows

References

External links 
 Official website

1963 births
Living people
Writers from Detroit
Oregon State University alumni
Pacific University alumni
Writers from Oregon